Bader-Werner Pretorius (born ) is a South African rugby union player for  in the RFU Championship. His regular position is fly-half.

Pretorius was born in Johannesburg.

After school, Pretorius joined the  academy, playing for them at Under-19 and Under-21 level between 2016 and 2018. He made his first class debut in their match against , scoring a try seven minutes after coming on as a replacement in a 25–21 victory.

Following the disbandment of Southern Kings, Pretorius signed for RFU Championship side Jersey Reds ahead of the 2020–21 season.

References

South African rugby union players
Living people
1997 births
Rugby union players from Johannesburg
Rugby union fly-halves
Southern Kings players
Jersey Reds players
Alumni of Michaelhouse
South African expatriate sportspeople in Jersey
Expatriate rugby union players in Jersey
South African expatriate rugby union players